Tucavaca Valley Municipal Reserve (Reserva Municipal Valle de Tucavaca) is a protected area in Bolivia situated in the Santa Cruz Department, Chiquitos Province, Roboré Municipality. The reserve is located at an altitude between 200 m and 1250 m above sea level (Mount Chochís). It comprises the Santiago mountain range (Serranía de Santiago) and the Tucavaca valley.

The historical Jesuit mission and town of Santiago de Chiquitos is located within the reserve.

External links 
 www.fcbc.org.bo / Áreas protegidas en la región del Bosque Chiquitano (Spanish)

Protected areas of Bolivia
Geography of Santa Cruz Department (Bolivia)
Protected areas established in 2000